The Miss Ecuador 2002 was on March 26, 2002. There were 11 candidates for the national title where Isabel Ontaneda from Pichincha was crowned Miss Ecuador 2002 by her predecessor, Jéssica Bermúdez from Guayas. The winner went to compete at Miss Universe 2002 and Miss International 2002.

Results

Placements

Special awards

Contestants

Notes

Returns

Last competed in:
2000
 Azuay
 Esmeraldas

Withdraws

 Chimborazo

External links

Miss Ecuador
2002 beauty pageants
Beauty pageants in Ecuador
2002 in Ecuador